Anthony 'Tolly' Compton Burnett (26 October 1923 – 31 May 1993) was an English cricketer. Burnett was a right-handed batsman who occasionally fielded as a wicket-keeper. He was born at Chipstead, Surrey, and was educated at Lancing College.

References

External links
Tolly Burnett at ESPNcricinfo
Tolly Burnett at CricketArchive

1923 births
1993 deaths
People from Reigate and Banstead (district)
People educated at Lancing College
Alumni of Pembroke College, Cambridge
English cricketers
Cambridge University cricketers
Marylebone Cricket Club cricketers
Glamorgan cricketers
Glamorgan cricket captains
Schoolteachers from Surrey